Prajila is a commune in Floreşti District, Moldova. It is composed of four villages: Antonovca, Frunzești, Mihailovca and Prajila.

References

Communes of Florești District